Jamie Milam (born May 13, 1984 in Lake Orion, Michigan) is an American professional ice hockey defenseman. He is currently a member of the Motor City Rockers of the FPHL he also recently played with the Fort Wayne Komets of the ECHL.

Playing career
Milam spent four seasons at Northern Michigan University before turning professional late in the 2005-06 season with the Fort Wayne Komets of the United Hockey League. He then spent two seasons in the ECHL for the Gwinnett Gladiators before making his first move to the European leagues in 2008, moving to Denmark's Metal Ligaen with TOTEMPO HvIK.

In 2012, Milam moved to the United Kingdom's Elite Ice Hockey League and signed for Welsh side the Cardiff Devils, but departed after just ten games and moved to GKS Katowice in Poland. In 2014, Milan returned to the Elite League, this time signing for Scottish side the Fife Flyers.

References

External links

1984 births
AIK IF players
American men's ice hockey defensemen
Bossier-Shreveport Mudbugs players
Cardiff Devils players
Copenhagen Hockey players
DVTK Jegesmedvék players
Fife Flyers players
Fort Wayne Komets players
GKS Katowice (ice hockey) players
Gwinnett Gladiators players
HC Thurgau players
HK Nitra players
Ice hockey players from Michigan
Living people
Northern Michigan Wildcats men's ice hockey players
People from Lake Orion, Michigan
Rosenborg IHK players
Soo Indians players
Toledo Walleye players
American expatriate ice hockey players in Scotland
American expatriate ice hockey players in Norway
American expatriate ice hockey players in Sweden
American expatriate ice hockey players in Denmark
American expatriate ice hockey players in Switzerland
American expatriate ice hockey players in Wales
American expatriate ice hockey players in Poland
American expatriate ice hockey players in Slovakia
American expatriate ice hockey players in Hungary
American expatriate ice hockey players in Italy
American expatriate ice hockey players in Romania